The  Dallas Cowboys season was the franchise's 23rd season in the National Football League.  The Cowboys finished with a record of 6 wins and 3 losses, placing them second in the NFC. After losing the season opener to the Pittsburgh Steelers (the first time the Cowboys lost a season opener in 17 years), the Cowboys won the next six, including five after the strike had ended. However, two losses at the end of the regular season cost them home-field advantage throughout the playoffs. After beginning their playoff run with victories over the Buccaneers and the Packers, the Cowboys traveled to Washington, where they met defeat at the hands of their arch-rival, the Redskins. It was the third straight season that the Cowboys lost in the NFC championship game. The Redskins would advance to win the Super Bowl.

The Cowboys featured big-play capability on both sides of the ball in 1982. The offense relied on running back Tony Dorsett, who led the NFC in rushing (and during the season set an NFL record with a 99-yard run from scrimmage against Minnesota), and quarterback Danny White, who finished second in the NFL in passer rating. Despite the retirement of longtime starters Charlie Waters and D.D. Lewis before the season, the Cowboys still tied for the NFC lead in sacks, and cornerback Everson Walls led the league with seven interceptions.

The Cowboys were the only team to defeat the Redskins in the 1982 season, winning a regular season matchup in Game 5 at RFK Stadium (the scheduled meeting at Texas Stadium was cancelled by the strike). The Cowboys were also the only team in the NFL who never trailed at halftime in '82.

For the only time in franchise history, Dallas did not play the New York Giants, as both meetings fell victim to the strike.

Offseason
Tex Schramm and Gil Brandt, proposed to the NFL competition committee a centralization of the evaluation process for the NFL draft prospects. Before this, teams had to schedule individual visits with players to run them through drills and tests. This proposition created the NFL Scouting Combine, which was first held in Tampa, Florida, in 1982.

Coincidentally, the 1982 NFL Draft was one of the worst in Dallas Cowboys history. It is mostly remembered because it was the year the Cowboys drafted cornerback Rod Hill in the first round. Hill would go on to become the symbol of the team's failed draft strategy of the eighties, when the Cowboys took too many gambles. From that draft only Jeff Rohrer and Phil Pozderac made contributions.

NFL Draft

Regular season

Schedule

Note: Intra-division opponents are in bold text.

Season summary

Week 1 vs Steelers

Week 13

Standings

Roster

Postseason

Playoff schedule

First round
 

}}
|}

Second round

Awards
 The Cowboys sent eight players to the Pro Bowl following the 1982 season: Bob Breunig, Pat Donovan, Tony Dorsett, Ed Jones, Harvey Martin, Herbert Scott, Everson Walls, and Randy White.
 Danny White and Tony Dorsett were named to the All-NFL second team by the Associated Press at quarterback and running back, respectively. On the defensive side of the ball, end Ed Jones and tackle Randy White were named to the first team, while end Harvey Martin and cornerback Everson Walls were named to the second team.
Everson Walls, NFL Leader, Interceptions, (7)

Publications
The Football Encyclopedia 
Total Football 
Cowboys Have Always Been My Heroes

References

External links
 Pro Football Hall of Fame
 Cowboys' 1982 season at NFL.com
 1982 Dallas Cowboys season at Pro Football Reference
 1982 season at Dallas Cowboys official site

Dallas Cowboys seasons
Dallas
Dallas